Arnold is a census-designated place (CDP) in Calaveras County, California, United States. The population was 3,843 at the 2010 census, down from 4,218 at the 2000 census. Arnold is located on State Route 4.

History
Arnold is named after Bob and Bernice Arnold, who, in 1927 opened the Ebbetts Pass Inn. Prior to that, the community consisted of two large ranches where logging was the main industry. The inn served as a stop for people traveling along the Ebbetts Pass route as well as lodging for those visiting nearby Calaveras Big Trees State Park. In 1928, Camp Wolfeboro was established nearby as a Boy Scout camp and continues to be in operation today. The first post office was opened in 1934. Bernice was its postmistress at one time.

In 2015 power lines sparked the Butte Fire, which destroyed 549 homes in nearby communities. Arnold was saved when the weather changed, but the fire caused an increased focus on fire safety, although the community was still, in 2019, considered a "very high fire hazard severity zone" due to its location on a ridge outside Calaveras Big Trees State Park, surrounded by dense forest of trees killed by drought and beetles.

Geography

Arnold is considered at high risk of wildfire by CalFire due to its forested ridgetop location with powerful wind gusts up brushy canyons.

Climate
Area has a Köppen Climate Classification of Csb, which is a dry-summer subtropical climate often referred to as "Mediterranean".

Demographics
As many as 45% of the dwellings are vacation homes, a factor in fire safety efforts, as absent owners do not always clear the brush from their properties.

At the 2010 census Arnold had a population of 3,843. The racial makeup of Arnold was 3,590 (93.4%) White, 20 (0.5%) African American, 28 (0.7%) Native American, 46 (1.2%) Asian, 7 (0.1%) Pacific Islander, 60 (1.6%) from other races, and 96 (2.5%) from two or more races. Hispanic or Latino of any race were 259 people (6.7%).

The census reported that 3,842 people (100% of the population) lived in households, no one lived in non-institutionalized group quarters and 1 (0%) were institutionalized.

There were 1,761 households, 340 (19.3%) had children under the age of 18 living in them, 1,024 (58.1%) were opposite-sex married couples living together, 113 (6.4%) had a female householder with no husband present, 50 (2.8%) had a male householder with no wife present.  There were 87 (4.9%) unmarried opposite-sex partnerships, and 11 (0.6%) same-sex married couples or partnerships; 472 households (26.8%) were one person and 201 (11.4%) had someone living alone who was 65 or older. The average household size was 2.18.  There were 1,187 families (67.4% of households); the average family size was 2.60.

The age distribution was 613 people (16.0%) under the age of 18, 184 people (4.8%) aged 18 to 24, 563 people (14.7%) aged 25 to 44, 1,436 people (37.4%) aged 45 to 64, and 1,047 people (27.2%) who were 65 or older.  The median age was 54.1 years. For every 100 females, there were 104.4 males.  For every 100 females age 18 and over, there were 99.8 males.

There were 4,897 housing units at an average density of ,of which 1,761 were occupied, 1,422 (80.7%) by the owners and 339 (19.3%) by renters.  The homeowner vacancy rate was 4.8%; the rental vacancy rate was 16.8%.  2,978 people (77.5% of the population) lived in owner-occupied housing units and 864 people (22.5%) lived in rental housing units.

Economy
Arnold has a chamber of commerce, the Greater Arnold Business Association.

Parks and recreation
Arnold is located in Stanislaus National Forest. Parks located in the area include White Pines Park and Calaveras Big Trees State Park. The Arnold Rim Trail, which was created in 2007, is a 17.5 mile multi-use trail that traverses protected land from Arnold to Avery.

Government 

State and federal grants following the Butte Fire have helped to thin overgrown brush in the area, and expand a bulldozed fire break created in the Butte Fire.

References

Census-designated places in Calaveras County, California
Census-designated places in California